Texasa is a genus of picture-winged flies in the family Ulidiidae.

Species
 T. chaetifrons

References

Ulidiidae